Qoʻshrabot District is a district of Samarqand Region in Uzbekistan. The capital lies at the town Qoʻshrabot.

The district consists of two urban-type settlements (Qoʻshrabot, Zarkent) and 7 rural communities.

References 

Samarqand Region
Districts of Uzbekistan